The Global Alliance of Technological Universities is a network of seven technological universities. It was founded in 2009.

Members 

 Carnegie Mellon University (United States of America)
 Imperial College London (United Kingdom) 
 Indian Institute of Technology Bombay (India) 
 Nanyang Technological University (Singapore) 
 Shanghai Jiao Tong University (People's Republic of China)
 Technical University of Munich (Germany) 
 University of New South Wales (Australia)

References

External links 
Official website 

International college and university associations and consortia
Organizations established in 2009